BAY 59-3074 is a drug which is a cannabinoid receptor partial agonist developed by Bayer AG. It has analgesic effects and is used in scientific research. It is orally active in animals, and has modest affinity for both CB1 and CB2 receptors, with Ki values of 48.3nM at CB1 and 45.5nM at CB2.

References 

Cannabinoids
Trifluoromethyl compounds
2-Hydroxybenzonitrile ethers
Phenyl sulfonate ethers
Diphenyl ethers
Resorcinol ethers